ABC 23 may refer to one of the following television stations in the United States:

Current
KAEF-TV in Arcata/Eureka, California
Full satellite of KRCR-TV in Redding, CA
KERO-TV in Bakersfield, California
KTMF in Missoula, Montana
WATM-TV in Altoona, Pennsylvania
WCVI-DT2, a digital channel of WCVI-TV in Christiansted, U.S. Virgin Islands

Former
WAKR-TV/WAKC-TV (now WVPX-TV) in Akron, Ohio (1953 to 1996)